The 2015 Telus Cup was Canada's 37th annual national midget 'AAA' hockey championship, played April 20 – 26, 2015 at Rivière-du-Loup, Quebec.  The Toronto Young Nationals defeated Grenadiers de Châteauguay in the final to win the gold medal.  The Regina Pat Canadians won the bronze medal.

Teams

Round robin

Tiebreaker: Head-to-head record, most wins, highest goal differential.

Playoffs

Individual awards
Most Valuable Player: Owen Sillinger (Regina)
Top Scorer: Owen Sillinger (Regina)
Top Forward: Owen Sillinger (Regina)
Top Defenceman: Jake Tesarowski (Regina)
Top Goaltender: Kyle Jessiman (Châteauguay)
Most Sportsmanlike Player: Mathieu Samuel (Collège Notre-Dame)
Esso Scholarship: Mikael Recine (Châteauguay)

Road to the Telus Cup

Atlantic Region
The Newbridge Academy Gladiators advanced to the Telus Cup by winning tournament held April 2 – 5, 2015 at the Community Gardens Arena in Kensington, Prince Edward Island.

Québec
The Grenadiers de Châteauguay advanced to the Telus Cup by winning the Quebec Midget AAA Hockey League championship series.

Central Region
The Toronto Young Nationals advanced to the Telus Cup by winning tournament held March 30 – April 5, 2015 at the Westwood Arena in Toronto, Ontario.

West Region
The Regina Pat Canadians advanced to the Telus Cup by winning tournament held April 2 – 5, 2015 at Credit Union Place in Dauphin, Manitoba.

Pacific Region
The Strathmore Bisons advanced to the Telus Cup by winning the best-of-3 playoff series held April 3 – 5, 2015 at the Doug Mitchell Thunderbird Sports Centre in Vancouver, British Columbia.

See also
Telus Cup

References

External links
2015 Telus Cup Home Page
Midget AAA Canada Website
Midget AAA Telus Cup Regional Championship Website

Telus Cup
2015 in Quebec
Sport in Rivière-du-Loup
Telus Cup
April 2015 sports events in Canada
Ice hockey competitions in Quebec